NS50, NS 50, NS-50, NS.50, or variation, may refer to:

Commemorations
 NS 50 Years Since Victory, a Russian celebration of the 50th anniversary of the Soviet victory in WWII
 Singapore 50th anniversary of National Service (NS50) in 2017 in Singapore
 Singapore National Day Parade, 2017

Transportation
 Lyet Pobyedi (NS 50), a Russian nuclear-powered icebreaker
 Honda NS50, a motorcycle; see List of Honda motorcycles

Other uses
 Waverley-Fall River-Beaver Bank (constituency N.S. 50), Nova Scotia, Canada; a provincial electoral district

See also

 NS (disambiguation)
 50 (disambiguation)